Bahamas competed at the 1988 Summer Paralympics in Seoul, South Korea. 4 competitors from Bahamas won no medals and so did not place in the medal table.

See also 
 Bahamas at the Paralympics
 Bahamas at the 1988 Summer Olympics

References 

Nations at the 1988 Summer Paralympics
1988
Summer Paralympics